Irakli Bolkvadze (born December 12, 1994 in Nicosia, Cyprus) is a Georgian swimmer, who specialized in breaststroke and individual medley events. He won a bronze medal in the boys' 200 m breaststroke at the 2012 European Junior Swimming Championships in Antwerp, Belgium with a time of 2:15.46. Bolkvadze is also trained by his personal coach Irina Minjulina.

Bolkvadze qualified for the men's 200 m breaststroke at the 2012 Summer Olympics in London by breaking a new Georgian record and eclipsing a FINA B-standard entry time of 2:16.35 from the European Championships in Debrecen, Hungary. In Georgia's Olympic history, he also became the first ever swimmer to surpass an invitation time set by FINA. He dominated the first heat by two seconds ahead of Kyrgyzstan's Dmitrii Aleksandrov, lowering his Georgian record time to 2:15.86. Bolkvadze failed to advance into the semifinals, as he placed twenty-eighth overall in the preliminary heats.

At the 2013 FINA World Championships in Barcelona, Bolkvadze demolished a new Georgian record of 2:03.55 in the 200 m individual medley, but finished thirty-fifth from the morning prelims. Bolkvadze is currently a member of Hamilton Aquatics Club in Dubai, United Arab Emirates under head coach Chris Tidey.

Personal bests 
 50 m breaststroke – 30.28 
 100 m breaststroke – 1:04.24 
 200 m breaststroke – 2:15.46 
 200 m individual medley – 2:03.55 
 400 m individual medley – 4:29.25

References

External links
NBC Olympics Profile

1994 births
Living people
Male swimmers from Georgia (country)
Olympic swimmers of Georgia (country)
Swimmers at the 2012 Summer Olympics
Male breaststroke swimmers
Sportspeople from Nicosia
People of Greek Cypriot descent